Duan Linxi (born 14 October 1990 in Baoshan, Yunnan), English name Jeremy, is a female Chinese singer, famous in China after winning the nationwide singing contest Super Girl in 2011. The same year, she released her first single, Dream Child, which is included in the album Baby Sister.

References

External links
 
 Official blog on Sina.com 

Super Girl contestants
Living people
1990 births